Ceylon competed at the 1964 Summer Olympics in Tokyo, Japan. Six competitors, all men, took part in six events in four sports.

Athletics

 Ranatunge Karunananda

Boxing

 Malcolm Bulner
 Winston Van Cuylenburg

Shooting

Two shooters represented Sri Lanka in 1964.

50 m rifle, prone
 Ravivimal Jaywardene
 Habarakadage Perera

Wrestling

 Ernest Fernando

References

External links
Official Olympic Reports

Nations at the 1964 Summer Olympics
1964
1964 in Ceylon